Oleg Yevgenyvich Belaventsev (born 15 September 1949 in Moscow) is a Russian naval officer (Vice-admiral) and political figure.

Biography
Belaventsev served as an officer in the Russian Navy, rising to the rank of vice-admiral. He was the third Secretary for Science and Technology at the Soviet embassy in London. On 24 April 1985 Belaventsev was among six Soviet diplomats deported from the United Kingdom on suspicion of spying. Following the dissolution of the Soviet Union, Belaventsev became deputy director of Rosvooruzhenie, Russia's primary arms trading agency.

From 2001 to 2012, Belaventsev was director of EMERCOM, a Russian state agency that manages the humanitarian efforts of the Ministry of Emergency Situations. He served under Minister of Emergency Situations Sergey Shoygu. During his tenure, Belaventsev founded private companies that were awarded ministry contracts to implement international humanitarian projects. According to the Organized Crime and Corruption Reporting Project, Belaventsev's companies received hundreds of millions in state contracts from the government agencies where he was employed. Belaventsev owns a 60% stake in Zarubezhtehcomproekt (ZTPP); others with 10% stakes include current EMERCOM director Alexander Mordovskiy, EMERCOM accountant Tamara Mikhailova, and Sergey Ivanov, who was Belaventsev first deputy at EMERCOM.

In 2012, Belaventsev followed Shoygu to Moscow, where he led the General Affairs Department of the Moscow Region Governor and Moscow Region Government. After Shoygu was named Minister of Defense, Belaventsev became general director of Slavyanka, among the largest ministry-controlled companies. Crimean officials reported that Shoygu advised Vladimir Putin to appoint Belaventsev as his envoy to Crimea.

On 21 March 2014, Belaventsev was appointed Presidential envoy (Plenipotentiary Representative of the President of the Russian Federation in a Federal District) of the newly created Crimean Federal District. His appointment coincided with the formation of the new federal district. Belaventsev is considered politically close to the Russian Defense Minister Sergey Shoygu. He was soon added to the lists of people sanctioned by the European Union and United States for the Russian invasion of Crimea.

On 28 July 2016, the Crimean Federal District was abolished and merged into the Southern Federal District in order to "improve the governance". On the same day, Belaventsev was appointed the presidential envoy in North Caucasian Federal District. On 26 June 2018, he was replaced by Aleksandr Matovnikov.

Notes

References 

1949 births
Living people
1st class Active State Councillors of the Russian Federation
Military personnel from Moscow
Russian admirals
People of the annexation of Crimea by the Russian Federation
Heroes of the Russian Federation
Russian individuals subject to the U.S. Department of the Treasury sanctions
Russian individuals subject to European Union sanctions
Businesspeople from Moscow